Army Training Units (ATU) provide Basic Training for a proportion of Army Reserve recruits in the British Army.

History
ATUs were created as Regional Training Centres (RTC) - which were in turn created from Brigade Specialist Training Teams (STT) - to provide basic training and specialist courses for the UK Army Reserve (formerly the Territorial Army). They were originally commanded and administered by their local Regional Forces (RF) Brigade. From 2012 they were renamed Army Training Units and command of the ATUs passed to Initial Training Group (ITG), part of the Army Recruiting and Training Division (ARTD), now part of ARITC. ITG is responsible for all Army Basic Training, both Regular and Reserve, except Regular Standard Entry Infantry.

Role
Army Training Units (ATU) are commanded and staffed by UK Army Reservists. Along with Regular Army Training Regiments (ATR), they provide Basic Training to Army Reserve recruits, except those joining the Honourable Artillery Company.
Reserves recruits are selected at an Army Recruit Selection Centre. They then undertake a short basic training course known as ‘alpha', over four weekends or a residential week.  The alpha course is followed by a 15.5-day residential 'bravo' course to achieve trained soldier status. These generic courses teach essential elements of the Regular Common Military Syllabus 2014 (CMS 14). Recruits will then attend Initial Trade Training courses as stipulated by their cap badge / Corps. The Honourable Artillery Company currently runs its own alpha course twice a year.

Locations
ATU North – Queen Elizabeth Barracks, Strensall and Altcar Training Camp
ATU Northern Ireland – Ballykinler Training Centre
ATU Scotland – Redford Barracks
ATU West – Wyvern Barracks, Exeter and Maindy Barracks, Cardiff

Reserves Basic Training courses (ALPHA and BRAVO) are also delivered by:
Army Training Centre Pirbright (ATC P), comprising 1 and 2 Army Training Regiments (1 and 2 ATR) and HQ Regiment, located at Alexander Barracks, Pirbright 
Army Training Regiment Winchester (ATR W) located at Sir John Moore Barracks, Winchester 
Army Training Regiment Grantham (ATR G) located at Prince William of Gloucester Barracks, Grantham and Venning Barracks, Donnington

See also
Army Training Regiment

References

External links
 Army Training Units at army.mod.uk

Military units and formations of the British Army
Army Reserve (United Kingdom)
Training establishments of the British Army